Sam Firstenberg (born Shmulik Firstenberg on March 13, 1950) is an Israeli-American film director.
He is best known for having made low-budget B-movies most of his career, among them the first two films in the American Ninja series, American Ninja and American Ninja 2: The Confrontation. Firstenberg's filmography includes genres such as comedy, action, musicals, drama, science fiction, thrillers, and horror.

Personal life
Born in Poland to a Jewish family, Sam Firstenberg grew up in Jerusalem. He has directed 22 theatrical feature films since completing his graduate studies in film at Loyola Marymount University.

Filmography

Director
For the Sake of the Dog (1979)
 One More Chance (1983)
 Revenge of the Ninja (1983)
 Ninja III: The Domination (1984)
 Breakin' 2: Electric Boogaloo (1984)
 American Ninja (1985)
 Avenging Force (1986)
 American Ninja 2: The Confrontation (1987)
 Riverbend (1989)
 The Day We Met (1990)
 Delta Force 3: The Killing Game (1991)
 Tropical Heat (1992)
 American Samurai (1992)
 Cyborg Cop (1993)
 Blood Warriors (1993)
 Cyborg Cop II (1994)
 Operation Delta Force (1997)
 Motel Blue (1997)
 McCinsey's Island (1998)
 The Alternate (2000)
 Criss Cross (2001)
 Spiders II: Breeding Ground (2001)
 Quicksand (2002)
 The Interplanetary Surplus Male and Amazon Women of Outer Space (2003)
 The Last Kumite (Pre-production)

Writer
For the Sake of the Dog (1979)
 One More Chance (1983)
 Cyborg Cop II (1994)

Producer
The Interplanetary Surplus Male and Amazon Women of Outer Space (2003)
Groove Street (2018)

References

External links
 - Sam Firstenberg - Filmography
 To me Cyborgs are magic - Interview with Sam Firstenberg

1950 births
American film directors
American people of Israeli descent
Action film directors
Living people
People from Wałbrzych
Polish emigrants to Israel